Aitmukhambetov (masculine) or Aitmukhambetova (feminine) is a Kazakh surname. Notable people with the surname include:

Gulnafis Aitmukhambetova (born 1988), Kazakh taekwondo practitioner
Tamas Aitmukhambetov (born 1939), Kazakh jurist

Kazakh-language surnames